Michael Simmons may refer to:

Michael Simmons (pioneer) (1814–1867), American pioneer
Michael Simmons (priest) (fl. 1976- ), Anglican clergyman and academic
Michael Simmons (RAF officer) (born 1937), British Air Marshal 
Mike Simmons (born 1983), American politician serving as an Illinois State Senator